Fabián Cornelio Balbuena González (born 23 August 1991) is a Paraguayan professional footballer who plays as a centre-back for Campeonato Brasileiro Série A team Corinthians and the Paraguay national team. He is also under contract with Russian Premier League club Dynamo Moscow, but that contract is suspended.

He played for Cerro Porteño PF, Rubio Ñu, Nacional and Libertad in the Paraguayan Primera División, before joining Corinthians of Brazil in 2016. He played 120 games for Corinthians, winning the Campeonato Paulista twice and the Campeonato Brasileiro Série A once, and was named in the latter's 2017 team of the year. After three years with West Ham United in the Premier League, he signed for Dynamo Moscow.

Balbuena made his senior international debut for Paraguay in 2015. He represented the country at four Copa América tournaments, coming fourth in 2015.

Club career

Paraguay
Born in Ciudad del Este, Balbuena was promoted to Cerro Porteño PF's first team in 2010, after the arrival of new manager Eduardo Rivera. He immediately became a starter under Rivera, playing in all the remaining seven matches of the campaign as his side achieved a mid-table position.

Balbuena became a regular starter in 2011, being also team captain as the club achieved promotion from División intermedia.

Balbuena joined Rubio Ñu ahead of the 2013 season, but remained at the club for only six months before moving to defending champions Club Nacional. At the latter side, he was also first-choice and reached the 2014 Copa Libertadores Finals, losing it to San Lorenzo.

On 15 August 2014, Libertad bought 50% of Balbuena's federative rights, and the player signed a four-year deal with the club. They won the 2014 Clausura tournament.

Corinthians
On 16 February 2016, Balbuena moved abroad for the first time in his career after agreeing to a three-year deal with Série A side Corinthians. He made his debut for the club nine days later by starting in a 1–1 Campeonato Paulista away draw against São Bento, and scored his first goal on 19 March in a 4–0 home routing of Linense for the same competition.

A key defensive unit at Timão, Balbuena lifted the 2017 Campeonato Paulista, 2017 Campeonato Brasileiro Série A and 2018 Campeonato Paulista during his spell. On 24 April 2018, he signed a new four-year contract.

West Ham United

On 14 July 2018, Balbuena signed for Premier League club West Ham United on a three-year deal, for an undisclosed fee. He made his debut on 12 August in a 4–0 defeat by Liverpool. On 27 October he scored his first goal for the Hammers to open the scoring at Leicester City, but deflected Wilfred Ndidi's long-range shot into his own net for the equaliser; he was the first Paraguayan to score in England's top division since Antolín Alcaraz in May 2012.

On 18 October 2020, Balbuena scored West Ham's first goal as they overturned a 3–0 deficit with eight minutes remaining to draw at London rivals Tottenham Hotspur. The following 24 April, he was sent off in a 1–0 home loss to another capital team, Chelsea, for catching Ben Chilwell when making a clearance; the decision was criticised by manager David Moyes and various pundits. The red card was overturned after West Ham appealed. In May 2021, Balbuena was told by West Ham that his contract would not be renewed when it expired at the end of the 2020–21 season.

Dynamo Moscow
On 9 July 2021, he signed a four-year contract with Russian Premier League club FC Dynamo Moscow.

On 10 July 2022, Balbuena suspended his contract with Dynamo Moscow for the 2022–23 season, having taken advantage of the FIFA ruling relating to the Russian invasion of Ukraine.

Return to Corinthians

On 18 July 2022, Balbuena returned to Corinthians for the period of his Dynamo contract suspension, until 30 June 2023.

International career
First called up on 19 March 2015, Balbuena made his full international debut for Paraguay national team on 31 March by starting in a 1–0 friendly loss against Mexico at the Arrowhead Stadium. He was also named among the 23-man squads for the 2015 Copa América and the Copa América Centenario. He made his first competitive appearance at the latter in the final group game, a 1–0 loss to hosts the United States in which he was substituted at half time for attacker Juan Iturbe.

Career statistics

Club

International

Scores and results list Paraguay' goal tally first.

Honours

Club
Cerro Porteño PF
División Intermedia: 2011

Libertad
Primera División: Clausura 2014

Corinthians
Campeonato Brasileiro Série A: 2017
Campeonato Paulista: 2017, 2018

Paraguay
Copa America copper medals:2015

Individual
Bola de Prata: 2017
Campeonato Brasileiro Team of the Year: 2017
Campeonato Paulista Team of the year: 2018

References

External links

1991 births
Living people
Sportspeople from Ciudad del Este
Paraguayan footballers
Association football central defenders
Paraguayan Primera División players
Cerro Porteño (Presidente Franco) footballers
Club Rubio Ñu footballers
Club Nacional footballers
Club Libertad footballers
Campeonato Brasileiro Série A players
Sport Club Corinthians Paulista players
Premier League players
West Ham United F.C. players
FC Dynamo Moscow players
Russian Premier League players
2015 Copa América players
Copa América Centenario players
2019 Copa América players
Paraguay international footballers
Paraguayan expatriate footballers
Paraguayan expatriate sportspeople in Brazil
Paraguayan expatriate sportspeople in England
Paraguayan expatriate sportspeople in Russia
Expatriate footballers in Brazil
Expatriate footballers in England
Expatriate footballers in Russia